Nigel Odell (born in Australian) is an Australian film producer. He is also a lecturer at the University of Melbourne. He is known for collaborations with Paul Hogan.

Filmography
 Funny Man, (1994)
 Green Money, (1998, short)
 Muggers, (2000)
 The Upstairs Neighbour, (2002, short, executive)
 Till Human Voices Wake Us, (2002)
 Strange Bedfellows, (2004)
 Long Weekend, (2008)
 Torn, (2010, executive)
 Cliffy, (2013)
 That's Not My Dog!, (2018, executive)
 The Very Excellent Mr. Dundee, (2020)

References

Australian film producers
Living people
Year of birth missing (living people)
Academic staff of the University of Melbourne